The State Rail Authority, a former statutory authority of the Government of New South Wales, operated and maintained railways in the Australian state of New South Wales from July 1980 until December 2003.

History

The Transport Authorities Act 1980 separated the functions of the  Public Transport Commission (formerly responsible for all public transport) and established the State Rail Authority. The State Rail Authority assumed responsibility for trains, while the Urban Transit Authority responsibility for buses and ferries.

In July 1982 a new colour scheme developed by Phil Belbin of red, yellow, orange and white was unveiled, which was commonly referred to as the "candy colours".  The L7 logo used by the Public Transport Commission was retained, albeit with the dark and light blue replaced with red and orange. Around this time, they also gave playing cards and soap to passengers.

Electrification
During its tenure the State Rail Authority completed a number of electrification projects:
Gosford – Wyong April 1982 
Wyong – Newcastle June 1984 
Waterfall – Port Kembla February 1986
Riverstone – Richmond August 1991
Coniston – Dapto January 1993

Rolling Stock
The State Rail Authority introduced new 80 Class, 81 Class and 86 Class locomotives used on both freight and country passenger services, K set, C set, Tangara, Millennium and V set double deck electric passenger trains and the XPT. It also placed an order for the 82 Class and 90 Class locomotives that were delivered to FreightRail in 1994. A fleet of Denning and Scania coaches was purchased to replace withdrawn country rail services.

Booz Allen Hamilton review and restructure

Following the election of the Greiner State Government in March 1988, consultants Booz Allen Hamilton were commissioned to prepare a report into NSW rail services. In November 1988, before the report was complete, the North Coast Overnight Express to Grafton, the Northern Mail to Moree and Tenterfield, the Bathurst day train, the Western Mail to Dubbo and the Canberra Monaro Express to Cooma all ceased.

After receiving the Booz Allen Hamilton report, the government released its response in July 1989 under the title CountryLink 2000. It was announced the number of staff employed on country rail operations would fall from 18,000 to 10,000, including the withdrawal of staff from 94 country railway stations and the Nyngan – Bourke, Queanbeyan – Cooma and Glen Innes – Wallangarra lines would close.

Several country passenger services ceased over the next few years including the Silver City Comet, Northern Tablelands Express, Canberra XPT, Brisbane Limited, Pacific Coast Motorail, South Coast Daylight Express, Intercapital Daylight and Sydney/Melbourne Express These were replaced either by XPT sets, EMU/DMU sets or coaches. Coach services which had been operated by the State Rail Authority's own fleet were contracted out to private operators. The report had recommended closing all country passenger services as they were judged unviable, however this was not politically acceptable.

The State Rail Authority was divided into business units: 
CityRail: responsible for suburban and interurban passenger services 
CountryLink: responsible for country passenger services 
FreightRail: responsible for freight services 
Rail Estate: responsible for rail property

CityRail adopted a blue and yellow colour scheme including L7 logo, CountryLink a blue, white and grey scheme and FreightRail a blue and yellow scheme.

July 1996 restructure
On 1 July 1996, the State Rail Authority was restructured into four distinct entities by the Transport Administration Amendment (Rail Corporatisation and Restructuring) Act 1996 to separate infrastructure from operations as required by the Competition Policy Reform Act 1995.<ref>"State Rail Restructure Announced" Railway Digest" May 1996 page 7</ref> This was part of the process of moving to an open access regime.

The entities were:
Freight Rail Corporation: responsible for freight services
Rail Access Corporation: responsible for managing track and providing access to public and private operators
Railway Services Authority: responsible for track and rolling stock maintenance
State Rail Authority: passenger service operator consisting of CityRail and CountryLink

February 1998 restructure
Another restructure in February 1998 saw the State Rail Authority split into four operating divisions:Annual Report 30 June 1998 State Rail Authority
CityRail Stations
CountryLink
Operations
Passenger Fleet Maintenance

January 2001 restructure
In January 2001, the Rail Access Corporation and Railway Services Authority were merged into the Rail Infrastructure Corporation that took responsibility for ownership and maintenance of the infrastructure.Annual Report 30 June 2001 Rail Infrastructure Corporation

January 2004 restructure and wind down
In January 2004, after much criticism and public perceptions of blame shifting between units for operational failings, RailCorp was formed taking over the passenger train operations from the residual State Rail Authority (CityRail and CountryLink) and responsibility for maintaining the greater metropolitan network from the Rail Infrastructure Corporation.Annual Report 30 June 2004 RailCorp

By June 2006 much of the operational function had been transferred, with the State Rail Authority in the process of being wound down.

Publication
From September 1981 until June 1989, State Wide'' was the SRA's inhouse journal.

References

See also
 RailCorp

Defunct railway companies of Australia
Railway
Australian companies disestablished in 2003
Railway companies disestablished in 2003
Australian companies established in 1980
Railway companies established in 1980